This article contains information about the literary events and publications of 1766.

Events
Early – The young Fanny Burney pays one of many visits to Samuel Crisp, a frustrated author and friend of her father living in retirement at Chessington Hall, England.
May 30 – The Theatre Royal, Bristol, England, opens. Also this year in England, the surviving Georgian Theatre (Stockton-on-Tees) opens as a playhouse.
July 1 – François-Jean de la Barre, a young French nobleman, is tortured and beheaded before his body is burnt on a pyre, with a copy of Voltaire's Dictionnaire philosophique nailed to his torso, for the crime of not saluting a Roman Catholic religious procession in Abbeville and for other acts of sacrilege, including desecration of a crucifix.
December 2 – The Law on the Freedom of Printing abolishes censorship in Sweden and guarantees freedom of the press.
unknown dates
The Drottningholm Palace Theatre is reopened as an opera house in Stockholm, Sweden, in its surviving form, designed by Carl Fredrik Adelcrantz.
Heinrich Wilhelm von Gerstenberg begins to publish his Briefe über Merkwürdigkeiten der Litteratur, in which he formulates the literary principles of Sturm und Drang.

New books

Fiction
Henry Brooke – The Fool of Quality
Oliver Goldsmith – The Vicar of Wakefield
Catherine Jemmat – Miscellanies
Charlotte Lennox – The History of Eliza
Susannah Minifie – The Picture
Sarah Scott – The History of Sir George Ellison
Pu Songling (died 1715) – Strange Stories from a Chinese Studio (聊齋誌異, Liaozhai Zhiyi; first surviving printed edition)
Christoph Martin Wieland – Geschichte des Agathon
Anna Williams – Miscellanies in Prose and Verse

Drama
George Colman the Elder and David Garrick – The Clandestine Marriage
Ramón de la Cruz – La pradera de San Isidro
Thomas Francklin – The Earl of Warrick
Elizabeth Griffith – The Double Mistake

Poetry

Mark Akenside – An Ode to the Late Thomas Edwards
Christopher Anstey – The New Bath Guide
James Beattie – Poems
John Cunningham – Poems
John Freeth – The Political Songster
Oliver Goldsmith, ed. – Poems for Young Ladies
Charles Jenner – Poems
Henry James Pye – Beauty
Heinrich Wilhelm von Gerstenberg – Gedicht eines Skalden

Non-fiction
Francis Blackburne – The Confessional (theology of confession)
Edmund Burke – A Short Account of a Late Short Administration
Denis Diderot – Essais sur la peinture
James Fordyce – Sermons to Young Women
Immanuel Kant – Dreams of a Spirit-Seer
Gotthold Ephraim Lessing – Laocoön
Franz Mesmer – De planetarum influxu in corpus humanum (On the Influence of the Planets on the Human Body)
Thomas Pennant – The British Zoology
Pedro Rodríguez Mohedano and Rafael Rodríguez Mohedano – Historia literaria de España, desde su primera población hasta nuestros días (Literary history of Spain, from the first publication to the present day)
Samuel Sharp – Letters from Italy
Tobias Smollett – Travels through France and Italy
Laurence Sterne – The Sermons of Mr Yorick vols. iii-iv
George Stevens (editor) – Twenty of the Plays of Shakespeare
Thomas Tyrwhitt – Observations and Conjectures Upon Some Passages of Shakespeare
John Wesley – A Plain Account of Christian Perfection

Births
January 3 – Nguyễn Du, Vietnamese poet (died 1820)
January 15 – Nathan Drake, English essayist and physician (died 1836)
February 1 – Eliza Fenwick, English novelist and children's writer (died 1840)
February 14 – Thomas Robert Malthus, English political scientist (died 1834)
April 22 – Germaine de Staël (Anne Louise Germaine Necker), French novelist and saloniste (died 1817)
May 11 – Isaac D'Israeli, English literary scholar (died 1848)
August 16 – Carolina Oliphant, Lady Nairne, Scottish songwriter and collector (died 1845).
October 11 – Nólsoyar Páll, Faroese merchant and poet (lost at sea c. 1808)

Deaths
March 3 – William Rufus Chetwood, Anglo-Irish playwright, novelist and publisher (year of birth unknown)
March 21 – Richard Dawes, English classicist (born 1708)
December 12 - Johann Christoph Gottsched, German philosopher (born 1700)

References

 
Years of the 18th century in literature